Minuscule 321 (in the Gregory-Aland numbering), α 254 (Soden), is a Greek minuscule manuscript of the New Testament, on parchment. Palaeographically it has been assigned to the 12th century. 
Formerly it was designated by 26a and 32p. It has marginalia.

Description 

The codex contains the text of the Acts of the Apostles, Catholic epistles, and Pauline epistles on 293 parchment leaves with lacunae (Acts 1:1-11; Hebrews 11:34-12:6). The text is written in one column per page, in 22 lines per page. The decorations are in colours and gold.

On the folio 294 it contains fragments from a 14th-century manuscripts of the Psalms (64(65):3-14 and 67(68):2-13).

Kurt Aland did not place the Greek text of the codex in any Category.

History 

The manuscript was written in the 2nd half of the 12th century.

The manuscript was in Constantinople in 1675. John Covel (1637-1722), British chaplain in Constantinople, purchased it in Adrianopol (together with codex 322). 
It later belonged to Robert Harley.

Formerly it was designated by 26a and 32p. In 1908 Gregory gave the number 321 to it.

It was examined by Mill (Cov. 3) and Bloomfeld. C. R. Gregory saw it in 1883.

The manuscript is currently housed at the British Library (Harley MS 5557).

See also 

 List of New Testament minuscules
 Biblical manuscript
 Textual criticism

References

Further reading 

 Cyril Ernest Wright, Fontes Harleiani: A Study of the Sources of the Harleian Collection of Manuscripts in the British Museum (London: British Museum, 1972), pp. 115, 459.

External links 

 Harley 5557 at the British Library

Greek New Testament minuscules
12th-century biblical manuscripts
Harleian Collection